Rimosodaphnella angulata is a species of sea snail, a marine gastropod mollusk in the family Raphitomidae.

The original combination is a junior homonym of † Daphnella (Raphitoma) angulata Peyrot, 1938

The authorship of this species has been erroneously attributed to Kuroda, 1958 by Chen-Kwoh Chang in 2001.

Description
The length of the shell reaches 30 mm.

Distribution
This marine species occurs off the Pacific coast of central Honshu, Japan and off Taiwan.

References

 Habe, Tadashige, and Osamu Masuda. Catalogue of the Molluscan Shells Donated by Mr. Hiroshi Noguchi to the Natural History Museum, Tokai University. Natural History Museum, Tokai University, 1990.
 Hasegawa, K., Okutani, T. and E. Tsuchida (2000) Family Turridae.In: Okutani, T. (ed.), Marine Mollusks in Japan. Tokai University Press, Tokyo, 619-667 (in Japanese)
 Higo, S., Callomon, P. & Goto, Y. (2001) Catalogue and Bibliography of the Marine Shell-Bearing Mollusca of Japan. Gastropoda Bivalvia Polyplacophora Scaphopoda Type Figures. Elle Scientific Publications, Yao, Japan, 208 pp.

External links
 Worldwide Mollusc Species Data base: Rimosodaphnella angulata
 Gastropods.com: Rimosodaphnella angulata

angulata
Gastropods described in 1990